Tafsir al-Manar is a work of Qur'anic exegesis (tafsir) by Rashid Rida, the contemporary Islamic scholar and the major figure within the early Salafiyya movement. The tafsir work can be fitted into the category of modern tafsir, which is distinguishable from the classical tafsir in the sense that it approaches to more contemporary issues through the broader scope of methodology it employs for the interpretation. The tafsir is also notable in the context of Islamic Movement, as it served as an avenue for Rida to profess and promulgate his ideology.

Content
Tafsir al-Manar was initially a collection of fragments of thought articulated by the founding figure of Islamic Modernism movement, Muhammad Abduh whom Rashid Rida was a disciple of. Rida then edited the tafsir into more concise and straightforward phrase and languages that can be understood by non-mufassirs and layman alike. The style in which involves simpler vocabularies and avoiding the mixture of scientific language and stylistic language is what he succeeded from the Al-Azhar education. The tafsir spans to 12 volumes and dealing with the contemporary issues through explaining the miracles and eloquence of the Qur'an, timelessness and application of Qur'anic teachings and the prophecy of the prophet Muhammad. Regarding the methodology, the tafsir can be considered as a combination of both tafsir al-riwaya, a tafsir that employs the traditional sources, and tafsir al-diraya, a tafsir that employs augmented sources.

Among the notable contents in the tafsir, Rida preceded Abul Ala Maududi, Sayyid Qutb, and later Islamists in declaring adherence to Sharia as essential for Islam and Muslims, saying,
Koran 5:44 applies to `...whomsoever thinks it distasteful to rule in accordance with the just rules which God sent down, and does not rule by them because he has different views, or because he has worldly interests. According to these verses, they are unbelievers; because true faith requires obedience. Obedience requires deeds, and is not consistent with omission'

References

External links
Tafsir al-Manar (in Arabic)

Manar

Manar